This is a list of awards and nominations received by Taiwanese vocal quartet boy band Fahrenheit.

HITO Radio Music Awards
The HITO Radio Music Awards are given annually by HITO Radio, the parent company of Taiwanese radio station Hit FM. The order is not specified for the Top 10 Songs of the Year.

Hong Kong TVB8 Awards
The Hong Kong TVB8 Awards are given annually by TVB8, since 1999, a Mandarin television network operated by Television Broadcasts Limited.

IFPI Hong Kong Album Sales Awards
The IFPI Hong Kong Album Sales Awards, formerly Gold Record Awards (金唱片頒獎典禮) is presented by the Hong Kong branch of International Federation of the Phonographic Industry (IFPI) since 1977. The order is not specified for the Top 10 Selling Mandarin Albums of the Year (十大銷量國語唱片獲獎).

Metro Radio Mandarin Music Awards
The Metro Radio Mandarin Music Awards are given annually since 2002, by Hong Kong radio station Metro Info. No order of ranking is specified for the Songs of the Year.

Awards by years

2006
 HK Metro Hits Awards, Best Foreign Newcomer
 2006 Sprite Awards, Taiwan Region: Most Popular Act Award
 2006 Sprite Awards, Best Duet Award: Only Have Feelings For You (只對你有感覺 Zhi Dui Ni You Gan Jue)
 2006 Sprite Awards, Best Group Award
 KKBOX Music Charts, Top 20 Singles of the Year : Only Have Feelings For You (只對你有感覺 Zhi Dui Ni You Gan Jue)
 KKBOX Music Charts, Best Drama Soundtrack: Hanazakarino Kimitachihe Original Soundtrack (花樣少年少女 電視原聲帶)

2007
 Canada Chinese Radiostation Music Charts: Best Newcomer (Group)
 Singapore Hit Awards, Top 10 Songs of the Year (933醉心龙虎榜 年度10大金曲): Love's Arrived (愛到 Ai Dao)
 Singapore Hit Awards, Courts Best MV (Courts 最佳音乐电影): Love's Arrived (愛到 Ai Dao)
 Singapore Hit Awards, Most Popular Newcomer (最受欢迎新人奖)
 Singapore Hit Awards, Most Popular Act of the Year (年度人气大奖)

2008
 2008 Roadshow Awards, Best Chinese Group
 KISS APPLE Love Songs Chart #1: Thank You for Your Gentleness (謝謝你的溫柔 Xie Xie Ni De Wen Rou)
 Mengniu Music Awards 2008: Fei Die Award
 SINA Music Awards, Best Group

2009
 2009 Sprite Awards, Taiwan Media Recommendation Award
 2009 Sprite Awards, Asia Pacific Region: Best Group
 2009 Sprite Awards, Hong Kong and Taiwan Region Top Song: Existing For You (为你存在 Wei Ni Cun Zai)
 2009 Sprite Awards: Best Performer Award
 2009 MusicRadio Top Charts, Hong Kong and Taiwan Region: Most Popular Group
 2009 MusicRadio Top Charts, Hong Kong and Taiwan Region: Most Popular Group on Campus
 2009 MusicRadio Top Charts, Best Song: New Home (新窝 Xin Wo)
 2009 MTV Music Festival Awards, Taiwan and Hong Kong Region: Most Stylish Group
 2009 Yahoo! Asia Buzz Awards (HK): Performing Group

2010
 2010 Sprite Awards, Hong Kong and Taiwan Region Top Song: Love You More and More (越来越爱 Yue Lai Yue Ai)
 2010 Sprite Awards, Taiwan Media Recommendation Award
 2010 Sprite Awards, Taiwan and Hong Kong Region: Best Performer Award
 2010 Sprite Awards, Asia Pacific Region: Best Group
 2010 MusicRadio Top Charts, Hong Kong and Taiwan Region: Most Popular Group
 2010 MusicRadio Top Charts, Taiwan and Hong Kong Region Most Played Song: Love You More and More (越来越爱 Yue Lai Yue Ai)
 2010 MusicRadio Top Charts, Taiwan and Hong Kong Region Top 10 Hits: Love You More and More (越来越爱 Yue Lai Yue Ai)
 2010 Mengniu Music Awards: Best Group
 2010 Mengniu Music Awards, Most Played Song: Love You More and More (越来越爱 Yue Lai Yue Ai)
 2010 Taiwan Top 10 Most Earning Singers

2011
 2011 Baidu Entertainment Boiling Point Awards: Best Group
 2011 Baidu Entertainment Boiling Point Awards: Hong Kong and Taiwan Region Top Song: Cherish Your Heartache (心疼你的心疼 Xin Teng Ni De Xin Teng)
2012- waiting

Note

References

Lists of awards received by Taiwanese musician
Lists of awards received by musical group